Guatevisión (an acronym of Guatemalteca and Televisión, officially known as Red Guatemalteca de Radiodifusión Sociedad Anonima) is a Guatemalan television channel operated by TVN and Librevisión and owned by Casa Editora Prensa Libre S.A., the owner of the newspaper Prensa Libre, whose headquarters is in Guatemala City. Their domestic operations began on May 12, 1975, by order of President Carlos Manuel Arana Osorio on the merger of public frequencies (5,19 and 25) to pass a single frequency. It was called National Educational Television (1975 - 1985) as a public television channel and years later, in 2003, it renamed the channel to Guatevisión as it changed into a privately owned channel with general programming and educational programming. Today, the channel has a 75.5% Guatevisión transmit frequency at the national level from the city of Guatemala.

References

External links

Guatevisión at LyngSat Address

Television stations in Guatemala
Spanish-language television stations
Television channels and stations established in 1975
Television channels and stations established in 2000